Brinza may refer to 
Brînza, a village in Moldova
Bryndza, a sheep milk cheese made in East-Central Europe
Ianoș Brînză (born 1998), Moldovan football goalkeeper 
Tiberiu Brînză (born 1968), Romanian rugby union player